The 2007 Speedway World Cup Qualification (SWC) was a two events of motorcycle speedway meetings used to determine the two national teams who qualify for the 2007 Speedway World Cup. According to the FIM rules the top six nations (Denmark, 
Sweden, Great Britain, Australia Poland, and United States) from the 2006 Speedway World Cup were automatically qualified. Qualification was won by Finland and Russia teams.

Results

Heat details

Abensberg (1) 
Qualifying round 1
 2006-05-28
  Abensberg, Motorstadion
 Referee:

Lonigo (2) 
Qualifying round 2
 2006-06-10
  Lonigo, Santa Marina Stadium
 Referee: ?

References

See also 
 2007 Speedway World Cup

Q